Pseudosubulina is a genus of predatory air-breathing land snails, terrestrial pulmonate gastropod mollusks in the family Spiraxidae.

The genus name refers to the fact that the shell of these snails loosely resemble that of the genus Subulina.

References 

Spiraxidae